Szamotuły  is a town in western Poland, in Greater Poland Voivodeship, about  northwest of the centre of Poznań. It is the seat of Szamotuły County and of the smaller administrative district Gmina Szamotuły. The population was 19,090 in 2011.

History

Szamotuły was probably founded in the 11th century, and was first mentioned in documents in 1231. Duke Przemysł I of Greater Poland established local fairs before 1257. Szamotuły was granted town rights in 1383 or earlier. It was a private town of Polish nobility, administratively located in the Poznań County in the Poznań Voivodeship in the Greater Poland Province of the Polish Crown.

During the joint German-Soviet invasion of Poland, which started World War II in September 1939, the town was invaded and then occupied by Germany. On September 12, 1939, the German Einsatzgruppe VI entered the town to commit various atrocities against Poles as part of the Intelligenzaktion. The Germans carried out mass arrests of local Poles under the pretext of "gathering, plotting, mistreating the Volksdeutsche and anti-German activity". Arrested Poles from the town and county were imprisoned in a newly established Nazi prison, and then hundreds were massacred in the nearby Bytyń, Kobylniki and  forests between October 1939 and January 1940. On October 12–13 and December 13, 1939, the Germans also carried out public executions of Poles in the town. In December 1939, the Germans carried out first expulsions of Polish intelligentsia and owners of shops and workshops, which were then handed over to German colonists as part of the Lebensraum policy. Further expulsions of Poles were carried out in 1940–1941 and 1944. Despite such circumstances, the Polish resistance movement was active in the town, and structures of the Polish Underground State were organized. The Germans also destroyed the pre-war monument of Polish insurgents of the Greater Poland Uprising. In 1945 the German occupation ended and the town was restored to Poland, although with a Soviet-installed communist regime, which remained in power until the Fall of Communism in the 1980s. In June 1945, the Home Army carried out a successful attack on a communist prison and liberated captured resistance members.

Sports
The local football club is Sparta Szamotuły. It competes in the lower leagues.

Notable people 
 Wacław z Szamotuł (1520s-1560s), composer and writer
 John Jonston (1603-1675), natural scientist and historian
 Siegmund Lubszynski (Lubin) (1841-1923), American film pioneer, the first Jewish "Movie Mogul"
 Philipp Scharwenka (1847-1917), composer and music educator
 Xaver Scharwenka (1850-1924), composer and pianist
 Hans Georg Friedrich Groß (1860-1924), German balloonist and airship constructor
 Alexander Hollaender (1898–1986), scientist
 Maksymilian Ciężki (1899-1951), cryptographer 	
 Ernst Wellmann (1904–1970), Wehrmacht officer 
 Małgorzata Braunek (1947-2014), actress

International relations

Twin towns – Sister cities
Szamotuły is twinned with:

Gallery

References

External links

 Official city webpage

Cities and towns in Greater Poland Voivodeship
Szamotuły County
Poznań Voivodeship (1921–1939)